Montaña Rusa ("Roller Coaster" in Spanish) may refer to:

 Montaña Rusa (La Feria Chapultepec Mágico), in Mexico City, Mexico
 Montaña Rusa (Parque del Café), in Quindio, Colombia
 Montaña Rusa (Tibidabo Amusement Park), in Barcelona, Spain
 Montaña Rusa, an Argentine telenovela
 La Montaña Rusa, an album by Dani Martín

See also 
 Russian Mountains